Pickup-56 is an album by Swedish dansband Lasse Stefanz released on 10 May 2006.

Track listing
När countryn kom till Skåne
Bring it on Home to Me
Mot en horisont
När inte himlen är så blå
Pauline
Har du glömt
Kärleken är blind
En timme försent
More than I Can Say
Klockorna har stannat
Det kanske är ditt hjärtas fel
Drömmar av silver
Jag bara älskar dig
Kom tillbaks Maria
Vad du än tänker

Charts

Weekly charts

Year-end charts

References 

2006 albums
Lasse Stefanz albums